The 2022–23 season is Abha's sixth non-consecutive season in the Pro League and their 57th season in existence. The club will participate in the Pro League and the King Cup.

The season covers the period from 1 July 2022 to 30 June 2023.

Players

Squad information

Out on loan

Transfers and loans

Transfers in

Loans in

Transfers out

Loans out

Pre-season

Competitions

Overview

Goalscorers

Last Updated: 18 March 2023

Assists

Last Updated: 18 March 2023

Clean sheets

Last Updated: 2 February 2022

References

Abha Club seasons
Abha